The Statute Law Revision (Pre-1922) Act 2005 (No. 32 of 2005) is an Act of the Oireachtas. Section 1 of the Act, with the Schedule, repeals statutes of Ireland, England, Great Britain and the United Kingdom of Great Britain and Ireland. The Act repealed around 200 statutes and is the first in a series of recent Statute Law Revision Acts enacted in Ireland as part of the Statute Law Revision Programme.  It was followed by the Statute Law Revision Act 2007, the Statute Law Revision Act 2009 and the Statute Law Revision Act 2012.

This Act has not been amended.

See also
Statute Law Revision Act

References
Parliamentary debates: 
Order for second stage – Seanad Éireann, volume 179, 13 April 2005
Second stage – Seanad Éireann, volume 179, 13 April 2005
Committee and remaining stages – Seanad Éireann, volume 180, 25 May 2005
Second stage – Dáil Éireann, volume 608, 20 October 2005
Referral to select committee – Dáil Éireann, volume 608, 20 October 2005
Order for report stage – Dáil Éireann, volume 611, 29 November 2005
Report and final stages – Dáil Éireann, volume 611, 29 November 2005
Report and final stages – Seanad Éireann, Volume 182, 8 December 2005

External links
The Statute Law Revision (Pre-1922) Act 2005, from the Irish Statute Book.

2005 in Irish law
Acts of the Oireachtas of the 2000s
Statute Law Revision 2005